The 1927–28 SM-sarja was the first-ever Finnish Ice Hockey Championship. The tournament featured six teams from three cities and was set up by the Finnish Ball Association, before the establishment of the Finnish Ice Hockey Association in 1929.

First round

Second round

Final

Viipurin Reipas wins the first-ever Finnish Ice Hockey Championship.

References
 Hockey Archives

Liiga seasons
1927–28 in Finnish ice hockey
Fin